The Lifetime Achievement Emmys are a class of Emmy Awards presented in recognition of the significant lifetime achievements of an individual in the American television industry. They are analogous to other awards based on cumulative achievement given out in the United States in the context of numerous career fields.

Winners who have been presented the Lifetime Achievement Emmy in the context of the News & Documentary Emmys, earning the citations due to their journalistic efforts, include Larry King, Ted Koppel, Andrea Mitchell, and Barbara Walters.

Notable instances involving the award include how performer Fred Rogers, an actor known for works decided to children such as Mister Rogers' Neighborhood, stopped the regular chain of events at the 24th Daytime Emmy Awards in 1997 by successfully commanding the audience to give a moment of silence of commemorative thankfulness. Rogers additionally got a standing ovation before his comments, in which he told the crowd "may God be with you".

History
Separate Lifetime Achievement Emmys are given out at the Daytime Emmys, the Sports Emmys (known as the Sports Lifetime Achievement Award), the News & Documentary Emmys, and the Primetime Engineering Emmy Awards (known as the Charles F. Jenkins Lifetime Achievement Award), among other Emmy ceremonies. The first Emmy Awards ceremony in history was held on January 25, 1949, taking place at the Hollywood Athletic Club of Los Angeles, California.

Details
Winners who have been presented the Lifetime Achievement Emmy at the News & Documentary Emmys for their journalistic efforts include Larry King, Ted Koppel, Andrea Mitchell, and Barbara Walters. For his role behind the scenes, mass media centric business magnate Ted Turner won the award in 2015. "There is no man that has made a bigger or more long-lasting impact on the world of television news than Ted Turner," Bob Mauro, the president of the National Academy of Television Arts & Sciences (NATAS), remarked.

Notable winners

British broadcaster David Frost, who conducted the interviews with former President Richard Nixon that received dramatization in the 2008 Oscar-nominated film Frost/Nixon, received a Lifetime Achievement Emmy at the International Emmys in 2009. 

Entertainment figures who have received a Lifetime Achievement Emmy at the Daytime Emmys include Judy Sheindlin, the central figure of Judge Judy, and John Clarke, a veteran film and television actor best known for starring on Days of Our Lives for thirty-seven years.

Receiving the award in 1997, performer Fred Rogers of programs decided to children such as Mister Rogers' Neighborhood delivered one of the most notable moments in an Emmy acceptance speech during the 24th Daytime Emmy Awards, successfully commanding the audience to give a moment of silence of commemorative thankfulness. Rogers got a standing ovation before his comments, in which he told the crowd "may God be with you".

In 2020, sports reporter Lesley Visser became the first woman to be awarded the Sports Lifetime Achievement Award, for her pioneering work in the generally male-dominated industry of sports television. "To be a pioneer at nearly every juncture... isn’t easy despite how Lesley Visser makes it look," Justine Gubar, the Executive Director of the Sports Emmy Awards, publicly remarked, while adding that Visser had become an "unparalleled role model and mentor to countless up-and-coming journalists".

In 2022, actor LeVar Burton became the first person to be honored with a Lifetime Achievement Award for his work on children's television. He will be presented with his award at the inaugural Children's and Family Emmy Awards on December 11, 2022. Burton's efforts to promote literacy in the United States has taken over two decades and involved multiple productions such as the television series Reading Rainbow; the performer has not only read books to young people but also explained current events to them and otherwise worked to educate them.

See also

History of the Emmys
List of lifetime achievement awards

References

Emmy Awards
Lifetime achievement awards